Vastola is an Italian surname. Notable people with the surname include:

 Gaetano Vastola (born 1978), Italian footballer
 Gaetano Vastola (gangster) (born 1928), American mobster
 Giovanni Vastola (1938–2017), Italian footballer

Italian-language surnames